Ben Brosnan is a Gaelic footballer who plays for the Wexford county team and he transferred to Castletown Liam Mellows from his native side Bannow Ballymitty.

Playing career
Brosnan was part of the Wexford panel in 2008. Wexford won Division 3 of the National League that year, beating Fermanagh in the final. Having beaten Meath and Laois, they reached that year's Leinster Championship final, but were comprehensively beaten by Dublin. However, subsequent victories over Down and Armagh, meant Wexford reached the All-Ireland semi-final. In the semi-final they lost to eventual All-Ireland champions Tyrone.

In 2008, he was also part of the Wexford under-21 team, and was sent off in the Leinster semi-final and missed out on the final loss to Kildare.

In 2009, he was not part of the Wexford senior team; instead he played with the junior team.

He made a huge impact in the 2011 championship with a number of high scoring displays. He scored 9 points in the 2011 Leinster Senior Football Final as Wexford lost out to Dublin.

Against Offaly in the 2022 Leinster Senior Football Championship preliminary round Brosnan scored 1-08.

Career statistics

References

 
 
 

1987 births
Living people
Bannow/Ballymitty Gaelic footballers
Gaelic footballers who switched code
Wexford inter-county Gaelic footballers
Association footballers from County Wexford
Association footballers not categorized by position
League of Ireland players
Republic of Ireland association footballers
Wexford F.C. players